The 6th Rajputana Rifles were an infantry regiment of the British Indian Army. They were formed in 1922, after the Indian government reformed the army. They moved away from single battalion regiments to multi battalion regiments. The regiment served in World War II and in 1947 was allocated to the new Indian Army after independence as the Rajputana Rifles.

During World War II the regiment was expanded to thirteen battalions and served in the Middle East, Burma and Malaya. The 4th Battalion had the distinction of earning two Victoria Crosses during this conflict.

Formation 1922
1st Battalion ex 104th Wellesley's Rifles 
2nd Battalion ex 120th Rajputana Infantry
3rd Battalion ex 122nd Rajputana Infantry 
4th Battalion ex 123rd Outram's Rifles
5th Battalion ex 125th Napier's Rifles 
10th (Training) Battalion ex 13th Rajputs (The Shekhawati Regiment).

References

Sources

British Indian Army infantry regiments
Military units and formations established in 1922
R
R